Lanitz Aviation is a German aircraft manufacturer based in Leipzig. The company specializes in the design and manufacture of aircraft fabric systems and in particular their Oratex material for model and ultralight aircraft. The company also has developed and produces three ultralight aircraft that were originally produced by British manufacturers Escapade Aircraft and The Light Aircraft Company.

The company at one time produced its own two-stroke aircraft engine, the  Lanitz 3W 342 iB2 TS.

Aircraft

References

External links

Aircraft manufacturers of Germany
Aircraft engine manufacturers of Germany